"Let Me Live" is a song written by Ben Peters. It was originally recorded by American country music artist Charley Pride. The song was produced by Jack Clement and was released as a single via RCA Victor Records in 1971. The song became a top 40 hit on the Billboard country chart and in Canada. It was Pride's only gospel recording to become a major hit.

Background and content
Under the supervision and guidance of Jack Clement, Charley Pride became country music's first commercially-successful African-American recording artist. By the early 1970s, he had several number one hits and released several studio albums. In 1971, he would release his first album of gospel music, which would include the song, "Let Me Live." The song was composed by Ben Peters. The song was recorded on February 2, 1971 at the RCA Victor Studio. Two additional gospel songs were recorded during the same session. Jack Clement would serve as producer for the song.

Release and reception
"Let Me Live" was released as a single via RCA Victor Records in April 1971. It was Pride's sixteenth single released in his music career. "Let Me Live" was actually the B-side on the single release. "Did You Think to Pray" was the original A-side but was not played as heavily at radio. It spent a total of nine weeks on the Billboard Hot Country Songs chart and peaked at number 21 on the list in May 1971. The song was Pride's first gospel recording (and only to date) to become a hit on country radio. It was also his first single to miss the country top ten since 1967. In addition, it also became a hit in Canada, also reaching number 37 on the RPM Country Singles chart in 1968. It was later released on Pride's 1971 gospel album, Did You Think to Pray.

Track listings
7" vinyl single
 "Did You Think to Pray" – 3:50
 "Let Me Live" – 3:23

Charts

References

1971 singles
1971 songs
Charley Pride songs
RCA Victor singles
Song recordings produced by Jack Clement
Songs written by Ben Peters